David Boui (born 28 June 1988, in Bangui) is a Central African Republican taekwondo practitioner. At the 2012 Summer Olympics, he competed in the Men's –68 kg competition and lost to silver medalist Mohammad Bagheri Motamed of Iran in the first round and to Afghan bronze medalist Rohullah Nikpai in the repechage.  At the 2016 Olympics, he lost to Lee Dae-hoon in the first round.

References

External links

Central African Republic male taekwondo practitioners
Olympic taekwondo practitioners of the Central African Republic
Taekwondo practitioners at the 2012 Summer Olympics
People from Bangui
1988 births
Living people
Taekwondo practitioners at the 2016 Summer Olympics